In Werder the Trees are in Bloom (German: In Werder blühen die Bäume) is a 1928 German silent film directed by Fred Sauer and starring Teddy Bill, Fritz Schulz and .

The film's art direction was by Kurt Richter.

Cast
 Teddy Bill as Karl  
 Fritz Schulz as Willie  
  as Frau Pieseke  
 Evi Eva as Evi Pieseke  
 Karl Elzer as Mr. Morray  
  as Mady Morray  
 Sig Arno as Herr von Blasius  
 Karl Platen as Droschkenkutscher Gustav  
 Sophie Pagay as Gustavs Frau

References

External links

1928 films
Films of the Weimar Republic
Films directed by Fred Sauer
German silent feature films
German black-and-white films